Library Foundation Hatta is a charitable association  library that assists national libraries in Indonesia.. 

Located in Yogyakarta, Hatta Library was the first library foundation that was established after the independence of Indonesia.

References

Libraries in Indonesia